Neotermes is a genus of termites in the Kalotermitidae family. The genus was first described by Nils Holmgren in 1911 (as a subgenus), and the type species is Neotermes castaneus.

Species
GBIF lists the following species:
Neotermes aburiensis Sjöstedt, 1926
Neotermes acceptus Mathews, 1977
Neotermes adampurensis Akhtar, 1975
Neotermes agilis (Sjöstedt, 1902)
Neotermes amplilabralis Han & Xu, 1985
Neotermes andamanensis (Snyder, 1933)
Neotermes angustigulus Han, 1984
Neotermes araguaensis Snyder, 1959
Neotermes aridus Wilkinson, 1959
Neotermes arthurimuelleri (Rosen, 1912)
Neotermes artocarpi (Haviland, 1898)
Neotermes assamensis Saha & Maiti, 2000
Neotermes assmuthi (Holmgren, 1913)
Neotermes binovatus Han, 1984
Neotermes blairi Chakraborty & Maiti, 1994
Neotermes bosei (Snyder, 1933)
Neotermes brachynotum Han & Xu, 1985
Neotermes brevinotus (Snyder, 1932)
Neotermes buxensis Sen-Sarma & Roonwal, 1960
Neotermes camerunensis (Sjöstedt, 1900)
Neotermes castaneus (Burmeister, 1839)
Neotermes chilensis (Blanchard, 1851)
Neotermes collarti Coaton, 1955
Neotermes connexus Snyder, 1922
Neotermes costaseca Scheffrahn, 2018
Neotermes cryptops (Sjöstedt, 1900)
Neotermes cubanus (Snyder, 1922)
Neotermes dalbergiae (Kalshoven, 1930)
Neotermes desneuxi (Sjöstedt, 1904)
Neotermes dhirendrai Bose, 1984
Neotermes dolichognathus Han & Xu, 1985
Neotermes dubiocalcaratus Han, 1984
Neotermes eleanorae Bose, 1984
Neotermes erythraeus Silvestri, 1918
Neotermes europae (Wasmann, 1910)
Neotermes ferrugineus (Holmgren, 1911)
Neotermes firmus (Sjöstedt, 1911)
Neotermes fletcheri (Holmgren & Holmgren, 1917)
Neotermes fovefrons Han & Xu, 1985
Neotermes fujianensis Ping, 1983
Neotermes fulvescens (Silvestri, 1901)
Neotermes gestri Silvestri, 1912
Neotermes glabriusculus Oliveira, 1979
Neotermes gnathoferrum Grimaldi, Lal & Ware, 2010
Neotermes gracilidens Sjöstedt, 1925
Neotermes grandis Light, 1930
Neotermes grassei Piton, 1940
Neotermes greeni (Desneux, 1908)
Neotermes hirtellus (Silvestri, 1901)
Neotermes holmgreni Banks, 1918
Neotermes humilis Han, 1984
Neotermes insularis (Walker, 1853)
Neotermes intracaulis Křeček & Scheffrahn, 2003
Neotermes jouteli (Banks, 1919)
Neotermes kalimpongensis Maiti, 1975
Neotermes kanehirai (Oshima, 1917)
Neotermes kartaboensis (Emerson, 1925)
Neotermes kemneri Sen-Sarma & Roonwal, 1960
Neotermes keralai Verma & Roonwal, 1972
Neotermes ketelensis Kemner, 1932
Neotermes koshunensis (Shiraki, 1909)
Neotermes krishnai (Maiti & Chakraborty, 1981)
Neotermes lagunensis (Oshima, 1920)
Neotermes larseni (Light, 1935)
Neotermes laticollis (Holmgren, 1910)
Neotermes lepersonneae Coaton, 1955
Neotermes longiceps (Cachan, 1949)
Neotermes longipennis Kemner, 1930
Neotermes luykxi Collins & Nickle, 1989
Neotermes magnoculus (Snyder, 1926)
Neotermes malatensis (Oshima, 1917)
Neotermes mangiferae Sen-Sarma & Roonwal, 1960
Neotermes medius Oshima, 1923
Neotermes megaoculatus Sen-Sarma & Roonwal, 1960
Neotermes meruensis (Sjöstedt, 1907)
Neotermes microculatus Sen-Sarma & Roonwal, 1960
Neotermes microphthalmus Light, 1930
Neotermes minutus Kemner, 1932
Neotermes miracapitalis Han & Xu, 1985
Neotermes modestus (Silvestri, 1901)
Neotermes mona (Banks, 1919)
Neotermes nigeriensis (Sjöstedt, 1911)
Neotermes nilamburensis Thakur, 1978
Neotermes ovatus Kemner, 1931
Neotermes pallidicollis (Sjöstedt, 1902)
Neotermes papua (Desneux, 1905)
Neotermes paraensis (Costa Lima, 1942)
Neotermes paratensis Thakur & Sen-Sarma, 1975
Neotermes parviscutatus Light, 1930
Neotermes phragmosus Scheffrahn & Křeček, 2003
Neotermes pingshanensis Peng & Tan, 2009
Neotermes platyfrons Scheffrahn & Křeček, 2001
Neotermes prosonneratiae Akhtar, 1975
Neotermes rainbowi (Hill, 1926)
Neotermes reunionensis Paulian, 1957
Neotermes rhizophorae Chakraborty & Maiti, 1994
Neotermes rouxi (Holmgren & Holmgren, 1915)
Neotermes saleierensis Kemner, 1932
Neotermes samoanus (Holmgren, 1912)
Neotermes sanctaecrucis (Snyder, 1925)
Neotermes sarasini (Holmgren & Holmgren, 1915)
Neotermes schultzei (Holmgren, 1911)
Neotermes sepulvillus (Emerson, 1928)
Neotermes setifer Snyder, 1957
Neotermes shimogensis Thakur, 1975
Neotermes sinensis (Light, 1924)
Neotermes sjostedti (Desneux, 1908)
Neotermes sonneratiae Kemner, 1932
Neotermes sphenocephalus Han & Xu, 1985
Neotermes sugioi Yashiro, Takematsu, Ogawa & Matsuura, 2019
Neotermes superans Silvestri, 1928
Neotermes taishanensis Han & Xu, 1985
Neotermes tectonae (Dammerman, 1916)
Neotermes tuberogulus Han & Xu, 1985
Neotermes undulatus Han & Xu, 1985
Neotermes venkateshwara Bose, 1984
Neotermes voeltzkowi (Wasmann, 1897)
Neotermes wagneri (Desneux, 1904)
Neotermes yunnanensis Han & Xu, 1985
Neotermes zanclus Oliveira, 1979
Neotermes zuluensis (Holmgren, 1913)

References

Termite genera